Brian Hooker may refer to:

 Brian Hooker (poet) (1880–1946), American poet, educator, lyricist, and librettist
 Brian Hooker (bioengineer), American bioengineer